Rise and Fall is the fourth studio album by the Austrian neoclassical dark wave band Dargaard.

Track listing

Credits
Tharen - all instruments, vocals
Elisabeth Toriser - vocals

2004 albums
Dargaard albums
Neoclassical dark wave albums
Dark ambient albums